The 2005–06 Milwaukee Panthers men's basketball team represented the University of Wisconsin–Milwaukee during the 2005–06 NCAA Division I men's basketball season. The Panthers, led by head coach Rob Jeter, played their home games at the U.S. Cellular Arena and Klotsche Center and were members of the Horizon League. They finished the season 22–9, 12–4 in Horizon League play to finish in first place. They were champions of the Horizon League tournament to earn an automatic bid to the NCAA tournament where they received a #11 seed and defeated #6 seed Oklahoma before losing to the eventual National Champion #3 seed Florida in the second round.

Roster

Schedule

2006 Horizon League Tournament 

First round games at campus sites of higher seeds
Second round and semifinals hosted by the top seed.
Championship hosted by best remaining seed

References 

Milwaukee
Milwaukee Panthers men's basketball seasons
Milwaukee